Captured Live at Carnegie Hall  is the second live album by Australian singer-songwriter Peter Allen, released in 1985. The album was recorded at Carnegie Hall, New York City on 20 and 21 September 1984.  It was recorded during Peter's sold out engagement which included a midnight concert due to popular demand.

Critical reception
William Ruhlmann of AllMusic compared this set to Allen’s 1977 live album ‘’It Is Time for Peter Allen ’’ saying "Captured Live at Carnegie Hall had an ease and assurance that the previous [live] set, for all its excitement, lacked.".

Track listing
 A1	"Not The Boy Next Door"	
 A2	"Arthur's Theme (Best That You Can Do)"
 A3	"I Could Have Been a Sailor"	
 A4	"You Haven't Heard the Last of Me"	
 A5	"Fade to Black"	
 B1	"Easy On the Weekend"	
 B2	"Knockers"	
 B3	"All I Wanted Was the Dream"	
 B4	"Fly Away"	
 B5	"I Go to Rio"	
 C1	"Everything Old is New Again"	
 C2	"Irving Berlin Medley"	
 C3	"Only Wounded"	
 C4	"Come Save Me" (duet with Nikki Gregoroff)	
 C5	"Somebody's Angel" (duet with Dian Sorel)	
 C6	"Harbour"	
 D1	"Don't Cry Out Loud"
 D2	"Quiet Please, There's a Lady On Stage"	
 D3	"Once Before I Go"	
 D4	"As Time Goes By"	
 D5	"I Honestly Love You"

Personnel
Dian Sorel, Nikki Gregoroff - backing vocals
Mark Berger - bass
Michael Braun - drums
Larry Saltzman - guitar
Michael Holmes - keyboards
Miguel Fuentes - percussion
Peter Allen - piano, vocals
Louis Cortelezzi - woodwind, saxophone

References

Peter Allen (musician) albums
1985 live albums
Live albums by Australian artists
Arista Records live albums
Albums recorded at Carnegie Hall